is a railway station on the Hidaka Main Line in Atsuma, Hokkaidō, Japan, operated by the Hokkaido Railway Company (JR Hokkaido).

Railway stations in Hokkaido Prefecture
Railway stations in Japan opened in 1913